Herman Louis Verlinde (born 21 January 1962) is a Dutch theoretical physicist and string theorist. He is the Class of 1909 Professor of Physics at Princeton University, where he is also the chair of the Department of Physics. He is the identical twin brother of Erik Verlinde.

References

External links
 

1962 births
Living people
Dutch string theorists
People from Woudenberg
Princeton University faculty
Utrecht University alumni
Identical twins